Lourdes Olivera (born 16 December 1970) is a former synchronized swimmer from Mexico.

References 

1970 births
Living people
Mexican synchronized swimmers
Olympic synchronized swimmers of Mexico
Synchronized swimmers at the 1988 Summer Olympics
Synchronized swimmers at the 1992 Summer Olympics
Synchronized swimmers at the 1991 World Aquatics Championships
Pan American Games medalists in synchronized swimming
Pan American Games silver medalists for Mexico
Synchronized swimmers at the 1991 Pan American Games
Medalists at the 1991 Pan American Games